Tuxináwa (Tuchinawa) is an extinct Panoan language of Brazil. It closely resembled Yaminawa dialects.

References

Panoan languages
Languages of Brazil
Extinct languages of South America